A mast cell (also known as a mastocyte or a labrocyte) is a resident cell of connective tissue that contains many granules rich in histamine and heparin. Specifically, it is a type of granulocyte derived from the myeloid stem cell that is a part of the immune and neuroimmune systems. Mast cells were discovered by Paul Ehrlich in 1877. Although best known for their role in allergy and anaphylaxis, mast cells play an important protective role as well, being intimately involved in wound healing, angiogenesis, immune tolerance, defense against pathogens, and vascular permeability in brain tumours.

The mast cell is very similar in both appearance and function to the basophil, another type of white blood cell. Although mast cells were once thought to be tissue-resident basophils, it has been shown that the two cells develop from different hematopoietic lineages and thus cannot be the same cells.

Structure

Mast cells are very similar to basophil granulocytes (a class of white blood cells) in blood. Both are granulated cells that contain histamine and heparin, an anticoagulant. Their nuclei differ in that the basophil nucleus is lobated while the mast cell nucleus is round. The Fc region of immunoglobulin E (IgE) becomes bound to mast cells and basophils and when IgE's paratopes bind to an antigen, it causes the cells to release histamine and other inflammatory mediators. These similarities have led many to speculate that mast cells are basophils that have "homed in" on tissues. Furthermore, they share a common precursor in bone marrow expressing the CD34 molecule. Basophils leave the bone marrow already mature, whereas the mast cell circulates in an immature form, only maturing once in a tissue site. The site an immature mast cell settles in probably determines its precise characteristics. The first in vitro differentiation and growth of a pure population of mouse mast cells has been carried out using conditioned medium derived from concanavalin A-stimulated splenocytes. Later, it was discovered that T cell-derived interleukin 3 was the component present in the conditioned media that was required for mast cell differentiation and growth.

Mast cells in rodents are classically divided into two subtypes: connective tissue-type mast cells and mucosal mast cells. The activities of the latter are dependent on T-cells.

Mast cells are present in most tissues characteristically surrounding blood vessels, nerves and lymphatic vessels, and are especially prominent near the boundaries between the outside world and the internal milieu, such as the skin, mucosa of the lungs, and digestive tract, as well as the mouth, conjunctiva, and nose.

Function

Mast cells play a key role in the inflammatory process. When activated, a mast cell can either selectively release (piecemeal degranulation) or rapidly release (anaphylactic degranulation) "mediators", or compounds that induce inflammation, from storage granules into the local microenvironment. Mast cells can be stimulated to degranulate by allergens through cross-linking with immunoglobulin E receptors (e.g., FcεRI), physical injury through pattern recognition receptors for damage-associated molecular patterns (DAMPs), microbial pathogens through pattern recognition receptors for pathogen-associated molecular patterns (PAMPs), and various compounds through their associated G-protein coupled receptors (e.g., morphine through opioid receptors) or ligand-gated ion channels. Complement proteins can activate membrane receptors on mast cells to exert various functions as well.

Mast cells express a high-affinity receptor (FcεRI) for the Fc region of IgE, the least-abundant member of the antibodies. This receptor is of such high affinity that binding of IgE molecules is in essence irreversible.  As a result, mast cells are coated with IgE, which is produced by plasma cells (the antibody-producing cells of the immune system). IgE antibodies are typically specific to one particular antigen.

In allergic reactions, mast cells remain inactive until an allergen binds to IgE already coated upon the cell.  Other membrane activation events can either prime mast cells for subsequent degranulation or act in synergy with FcεRI signal transduction. In general, allergens are proteins or polysaccharides. The allergen binds to the antigen-binding sites, which are situated on the variable regions of the IgE molecules bound to the mast cell surface. It appears that binding of two or more IgE molecules (cross-linking) is required to activate the mast cell. The clustering of the intracellular domains of the cell-bound Fc receptors, which are associated with the cross-linked IgE molecules, causes a complex sequence of reactions inside the mast cell that lead to its activation.  Although this reaction is most well understood in terms of allergy, it appears to have evolved as a defense system against parasites and bacteria.

Mast cell mediators

A unique, stimulus-specific set of mast cell mediators is released through degranulation following the activation of cell surface receptors on mast cells. Examples of mediators that are released into the extracellular environment during mast cell degranulation include:
 serine proteases, such as tryptase and chymase
 histamine (2–5 picograms per mast cell)
 serotonin
 proteoglycans, mainly heparin (active as anticoagulant) and some chondroitin sulfate proteoglycans
 adenosine triphosphate (ATP)
 lysosomal enzymes
 β-hexosaminidase
 β-glucuronidase
 arylsulfatases
 newly formed lipid mediators (eicosanoids):
 thromboxane
 prostaglandin D2
 leukotriene C4
 platelet-activating factor
 cytokines
 TNF-α
 basic fibroblast growth factor
 interleukin-4
 stem cell factor
 chemokines, such as eosinophil chemotactic factor
 reactive oxygen species

Histamine dilates post-capillary venules, activates the endothelium, and increases blood vessel permeability. This leads to local edema (swelling), warmth, redness, and the attraction of other inflammatory cells to the site of release.  It also depolarizes nerve endings (leading to itching or pain). Cutaneous signs of histamine release are the "flare and wheal"-reaction.  The bump and redness immediately following a mosquito bite are a good example of this reaction, which occurs seconds after challenge of the mast cell by an allergen.

The other physiologic activities of mast cells are much less-understood.  Several lines of evidence suggest that mast cells may have a fairly fundamental role in innate immunity: They are capable of elaborating a vast array of important cytokines and other inflammatory mediators such as TNF-α; they express multiple "pattern recognition receptors" thought to be involved in recognizing broad classes of pathogens; and mice without mast cells seem to be much more susceptible to a variety of infections.

Mast cell granules carry a variety of bioactive chemicals.  These granules have been found to be transferred to adjacent cells of the immune system and neurons in a process of transgranulation via mast cell pseudopodia.

In the nervous system
Unlike other hematopoietic cells of the immune system, mast cells naturally occur in the human brain where they interact with the neuroimmune system. In the brain, mast cells are located in a number of structures that mediate visceral sensory (e.g. pain) or neuroendocrine functions or that are located along the blood–cerebrospinal fluid barrier, including the pituitary stalk, pineal gland, thalamus, and hypothalamus, area postrema, choroid plexus, and in the dural layer of the meninges near meningeal nociceptors. Mast cells serve the same general functions in the body and central nervous system, such as effecting or regulating allergic responses, innate and adaptive immunity, autoimmunity, and inflammation. Across systems, mast cells serve as the main effector cell through which pathogens can affect the gut–brain axis.

In the gut
In the gastrointestinal tract, mucosal mast cells are located in close proximity to sensory nerve fibres, which communicate bidirectionally. When these mast cells initially degranulate, they release mediators (e.g., histamine, tryptase, and serotonin) which activate, sensitize, and upregulate membrane expression of nociceptors (i.e., TRPV1) on visceral afferent neurons via their receptors (respectively, HRH1, HRH2, HRH3, PAR2, 5-HT3); in turn, neurogenic inflammation, visceral hypersensitivity, and intestinal dysmotility (i.e., impaired peristalsis) result. Neuronal activation induces neuropeptide (substance P and calcitonin gene-related peptide) signaling to mast cells where they bind to their associated receptors and trigger degranulation of a distinct set of mediators (β-Hexosaminidase, cytokines, chemokines, PGD2, leukotrienes, and eoxins).

Physiology

Structure of the high-affinity IgE receptor, FcεR1
FcεR1 is a high affinity IgE-receptor that is expressed on the surface of the mast cell. FcεR1 is a tetramer made of one alpha (α) chain, one beta (β) chain, and two identical, disulfide-linked gamma (γ) chains. The binding site for IgE is formed by the extracellular portion of the α chain that contains two domains that are similar to Ig. One transmembrane domain contains an aspartic acid residue, and one contains a short cytoplasmic tail. The β chain contains, a single immunoreceptor tyrosine-based activation motif ITAM, in the cytoplasmic region. Each γ chain has one ITAM on the cytoplasmic region. The signaling cascade from the receptor is initiated when the ITAMs of the β and γ chains are phosphorylated by tyrosine. This signal is required for the activation of mast cells. Type 2 helper T cells,(Th2) and many other cell types lack the β chain, so signaling is mediated only by the γ chain. This is due to the α  chain containing endoplasmic reticulum retention signals that causes the α-chains to remain degraded in the ER. The assembly of the α chain with the co-transfected β and γ chains mask the ER retention and allows the α β γ complex to be exported to the golgi apparatus to the plasma membrane in rats. In humans, only the γ complex is needed to counterbalance the α chain ER retention.

Allergen process
Allergen-mediated FcεR1 cross-linking signals are very similar to the signaling event resulting in antigen binding to lymphocytes. The Lyn tyrosine kinase is associated with the cytoplasmic end of the FcεR1 β chain. The antigen cross-links the FcεR1 molecules, and Lyn tyrosine kinase phosphorylates the ITAMs in the FcεR1 β and γ chain in the cytoplasm. Upon the phosphorylation, the Syk tyrosine kinase gets recruited to the ITAMs located on the γ chains. This causes activation of the Syk tyrosine kinase, causing it to phosphorylate. Syk functions as a signal amplifying kinase activity due to the fact that it targets multiple proteins and causes their activation. This antigen stimulated phosphorylation causes the activation of other proteins in the FcεR1-mediated signaling cascade.

Degranulation and fusion
An important adaptor protein activated by the Syk phosphorylation step is the linker for activation of T cells (LAT). LAT can be modified by phosphorylation to create novel binding sites. Phospholipase C gamma (PLCγ) becomes phosphorylated once bound to LAT, and is then used to catalyze phosphatidylinositol bisphosphate breakdown to yield inositol trisphosphate (IP3) and diacyglycerol (DAG). IP3 elevates calcium levels, and DAG activates protein kinase C (PKC). This is not the only way that PKC is made. The tyrosine kinase FYN phosphorylates Grb2-associated-binding protein 2 (Gab2), which binds to phosphoinositide 3-kinase, which activates PKC. PKC leads to the activation of myosin light-chain phosphorylation granule movements, which disassembles the actin–myosin complexes to allow granules to come into contact with the plasma membrane. The mast cell granule can now fuse with the plasma membrane. Soluble N-ethylmaleimide sensitive fusion attachment protein receptor SNARE complex mediates this process. Different SNARE proteins interact to form different complexes that catalyze fusion. Rab3 guanosine triphosphatases and Rab-associated kinases and phosphatases regulate granule membrane fusion in resting mast cells.

MRGPRX2 mast cell receptor

Human mast-cell-specific G-protein-coupled receptor MRGPRX2 plays a key role in the recognition of pathogen associated molecular patterns (PAMPs) and initiating an antibacterial response. MRGPRX2 is able to bind to competence stimulating peptide (CSP) 1 - a quorum sensing molecule (QSM) produced by Gram-positive bacteria. This leads to signal transduction to a G protein and activation of the mast cell. Mast cell activation induces the release of antibacterial mediators including ROS, TNF-α and PRGD2 which institute the recruitment of other immune cells to inhibit bacterial growth and biofilm formation.

The MRGPRX2 receptor is a possible therapeutic target and can be pharmacologically activated using the agonist compound 48/80 to control bacterial infection. It is also hypothesised that other QSMs and even Gram-negative bacterial signals can activate this receptor. This might particularly be the case during Bartonella chronic infections where it appears clearly in human symptomatology that these patients all have a mast cell activation syndrome due to the presence of a not yet defined quorum sensing molecule (basal histamine itself?). Those patients are prone to food intolerance driven by another less specific path than the IgE receptor path: certainly the MRGPRX2 route. These patients also show cyclical skin pathergy and dermographism, every time the bacteria exits its hidden intracellular location.

Enzymes

Clinical significance

Parasitic infections

Mast cells are activated in response to infection by pathogenic parasites, such as certain helminths and protozoa, through IgE signaling.

Mast cell activation disorders 

Mast cell activation disorders (MCAD) are a spectrum of immune disorders that are unrelated to pathogenic infection and involve similar symptoms that arise from secreted mast cell intermediates, but differ slightly in their pathophysiology, treatment approach, and distinguishing symptoms.  The classification of mast cell activation disorders was laid out in 2010.

Allergic disease

Allergies are mediated through IgE signaling which triggers mast cell degranulation. Recently, IgE-independent "pseudo-allergic" reactions are thought to also be mediated via the MRGPRX2 receptor activation of mast cells (e.g. drugs such as muscle relaxants, opioids, Icatibant and fluoroquinolones).

Many forms of cutaneous and mucosal allergy are mediated in large part by mast cells; they play a central role in asthma, eczema, itch (from various causes), allergic rhinitis and allergic conjunctivitis. Antihistamine drugs act by blocking histamine action on nerve endings. Cromoglicate-based drugs (sodium cromoglicate, nedocromil) block a calcium channel essential for mast cell degranulation, stabilizing the cell and preventing release of histamine and related mediators. Leukotriene antagonists (such as montelukast and zafirlukast) block the action of leukotriene mediators and are being used increasingly in allergic diseases.

Calcium triggers the secretion of histamine from mast cells after previous exposure to sodium fluoride. The secretory process can be divided into a fluoride-activation step and a calcium-induced secretory step. It was observed that the fluoride-activation step is accompanied by an elevation of cyclic adenosine monophosphate (cAMP) levels within the cells. The attained high levels of cAMP persist during histamine release. It was further found that catecholamines do not markedly alter the fluoride-induced histamine release. It was also confirmed that the second, but not the first, step in sodium fluoride-induced histamine secretion is inhibited by theophylline. Vasodilation and increased permeability of capillaries are a result of both H1 and H2 receptor types.

Stimulation of histamine activates a histamine (H2)-sensitive adenylate cyclase of oxyntic cells, and there is a rapid increase in cellular [cAMP] that is involved in activation of H+ transport and other associated changes of oxyntic cells.

Anaphylaxis
In anaphylaxis (a severe systemic reaction to allergens, such as nuts, bee stings, or drugs), the body-wide degranulation of mast cells leads to vasodilation and, if severe, symptoms of life-threatening shock.

Histamine is a vasodilatory substance released during anaphylaxis.

Autoimmunity
Mast cells may be implicated in the pathology associated with autoimmune, inflammatory disorders of the joints. They have been shown to be involved in the recruitment of inflammatory cells to the joints (e.g., rheumatoid arthritis) and skin (e.g., bullous pemphigoid), and this activity is dependent on antibodies and complement components.

Mastocytosis and clonal disorders

Mastocytosis is a rare clonal mast cell disorder involving the presence of too many mast cells (mastocytes) and CD34+ mast cell precursors. Mutations in c-Kit are associated with mastocytosis.

Monoclonal disorders

Neoplastic disorders
Mastocytomas, or mast cell tumors, can secrete excessive quantities of degranulation products. They are often seen in dogs and cats.  Other neoplastic disorders associated with mast cells include mast cell sarcoma and mast cell leukemia.

Mast cell activation syndrome

Mast cell activation syndrome (MCAS) is an idiopathic immune disorder that involves recurrent and excessive mast cell degranulation and which produces symptoms that are similar to other mast cell activation disorders.  The syndrome is diagnosed based upon four sets of criteria involving treatment response, symptoms, a differential diagnosis, and biomarkers of mast cell degranulation.

History
Mast cells were first described by Paul Ehrlich in his 1878 doctoral thesis on the basis of their unique staining characteristics and large granules. These granules also led him to the incorrect belief that they existed to nourish the surrounding tissue, so he named them Mastzellen (as of animals).  They are now considered to be part of the immune system.

Research

Autism
Research into an immunological contribution to autism suggests that autism spectrum disorder (ASD) children may present with "allergic-like" problems in the absence of elevated serum IgE and chronic urticaria, suggesting non-allergic mast cell activation in response to environmental and stress triggers. This mast cell activation could contribute to brain inflammation and neurodevelopmental problems.

Histological staining
Toluidine blue: one of the most common stains for acid mucopolysaccharides and glycoaminoglycans, components of mast cells granules.

Bismarck brown: stains mast cell granules brown.

Surface markers: cell surface markers of mast cells were discussed in detail by Heneberg, claiming that mast cells may be inadvertently included in the stem or progenitor cell isolates, since part of them is positive for the CD34 antigen. The classical mast cell markers include the high-affinity IgE receptor, CD117 (c-Kit), and CD203c (for most of the mast cell populations). Expression of some molecules may change in course of the mast cell activation.

Other organisms 
Mast cells and enterochromaffin cells are the source of most serotonin in the stomach in rodents.

See also

 Allergy
 Mast cell activation syndrome
 Diamine oxidase
 Granulocyte
 Food intolerance
 Histamine
 Histamine intolerance
 Histamine N-methyltransferase or HNMT

References

External links

 

Cell biology
Connective tissue cells
Granulocytes
Human cells